Julio Estrada Velasco  (born 10 April 1943) is a composer, theoretician, historian, pedagogue, and interpreter.

Life
Estrada was born in Mexico City, where his family had been exiled from Spain since 1941. He began his musical studies in Mexico from 1953–65, where he studied composition with Julián Orbón. In Paris from 1965-69 he studied with Nadia Boulanger, Olivier Messiaen and attended courses and lectures of Iannis Xenakis. In Germany he studied with Karlheinz Stockhausen in 1968 and with György Ligeti in 1972. He completed a Ph.D in  Musicology at Strasbourg University from 1990–1994.

Since 1974 he became researcher in music at the UNAM Instituto de Investigaciones Estéticas, where he was appointed as the Chair of a project on Mexican Music History and as the head of "Música, Sistema Interactivo de Investigación y Composición", a musical system designed by himself. He is the first music scholar to be honored as member of the Science Academy of Mexico, and by the Mexican Education Ministry as National Researcher since 1984, and since 1985 at the top level (III). He created the Laboratorio de Creación Musical at UNAM, where he has been teaching theory and philosophy of musical creation.

He has written more than a hundred articles based on his research. Some have been translated into English, French, German, Italian, Japanese and Norwegian. He is the General Editor of La Música de México  He wrote with Jorge Gil  (IIE UNAM, Mexico 1984). He has postulated a General Theory of Intervallic Classes, applicable to macro and microintervallic scales of duration and of pitch. He has developed together with M. Díaz and Víctor Adán the computer music program MUSIIC to generate the combinatory potential of music scales based on the division of the octave.

In the field of the continuum Estrada has developed new methods of multidimensional graphic representation of different components of sound (pitch, dynamics, colour), rhythm (pulse, attack, vibrato) and three-dimensional physical space. His first research on the continuum field was published in 1998 in Darmstadt : Ouvrir l’horizon du son: le continuum.

He has been a visiting professor at Stanford, California, San Diego, New Mexico,  Musikwissenschaft Institut, Rostock, Sorbonne and Darmstadt.

Work

Music
His music is associated to compositional research on diverse domaines:

scales:
Suite, piano 1960

improvisational processes:
Persona, vocal trio 1969

compositional mechanos:
Memorias for a Keyboard 1971

finite Group Algebra and networks theory:
Melódica, 1973
Canto mnémico 1973-83

intervallic identities:
Canto tejido, piano 1974
Canto alterno, cello 1978
Canto oculto, violin 1977

discontinuum and continuum macro-timbre and sound spacialization:
Canto naciente, brass octet 1975-78
eolo'oolin, six percussionists 1981-90

continuum and multiparametric polyphony:
eua'on, electronic (UPIC) 1980
eua'on'ome, orchestra 1995
yuunohui'se, 'ome, 'yei, nahui, for the strings 1983-90
yuunohui'wah, noisemaker 2008
yuunohui'ehecatl, winds 2012

continuum topological variation:
ishini’ioni, string quartet 1984-90

continuum-discontinuum modulation:
yuunohui’tlapoa, keyboard 1997

new conception of the opera:
Murmullos del páramo, voices, instruments and electronic spatialization 1992-2006

Scores
His works are mainly published by Juliusedimus and Editions Salabert, France.

Articles

Books
Musica Y Teoria De Grupos Finitos: 3 Variables Booleanas, with an English resumé, Estrada, Julio, Jorge Gil. UNAM, 1st edition (1984). (Format: Book (Illustrated), 221 pages,)

La música de México, Julio Estrada editor, 10 vols, History, Bibliographcial guide and Music Anthology, UNAM 1984-88

El sonido en Rulfo: el ruido ese, with a CD containing sound examples and "Doloritas", first part of the opera Murmullos del páramo, UNAM, 1st edition 1989, 2nd edition 2006

Canto roto: Silvestre Revueltas, UNAM-FCE 2012

Software
eua'oolin
Music system conceived by Estrada was developed by Mario Peña to generate tridimensional trajectories representing 3 different components of sound (pitch, dynamics, colour) to be converted into a musical score with pitch resolutions of 1/3, 1/4, 1/5, 1/6, 1/8 of tone, UNAM 1990-1995.

UPIC-Win
Windows version of the UPIC by Xenakis developed by Marino, Fontaliirant and Estrada at the CEMAMu, France, 2000-2001.

Músiic-Win
d1 Theory, Teoría d1. This program, conceived by Estrada and based on his d1 Theory, was designed and developed by Max Díaz and Víctor Adán.

Statement
The techniques and theories I have developed are based on mathematics and acoustics ; the more neutral they remain, the better they serve the description of the imaginary : it is my ear---there everything is allowed---that gives birth to my music, which becomes the accurate, almost phonographic representation, of every detail coming from my inner hearing experiences.

Awards
 Premio Universidad Nacional (2000)
 Ordre des Arts et des Lettres awarded by the  French Ministry of Culture, (1981, 1986)

Notes

External links
Estrada, Julio: publisher website (Salabert / Universal Classical Music)
Julio Estrada: program notes (Miller Theatre, Columbia University School of the Arts)
 Estrada: UNESCO Culture Sector
portrait image
Estradando: personal blog

1943 births
Living people
Mexican male classical composers
Mexican classical composers
Mexican music theorists
Mexican musicologists
Mexican people of Spanish descent
People from Mexico City
Pupils of Karlheinz Stockhausen